The Xavier Gold Rush and Gold Nuggets are the athletic teams that represent Xavier University of Louisiana, located in New Orleans, Louisiana, in intercollegiate sports as a member of the National Association of Intercollegiate Athletics (NAIA), primarily competing in the Red River Athletic Conference (RRAC) since the 2021–22 academic year. The Gold Rush and Gold Nuggets previously competed in the Gulf Coast Athletic Conference (GCAC) from 1981–82 to 2020–21.

Varsity teams
Xavier (La.) competes in 12 intercollegiate varsity sports: Men's sports include baseball, basketball, cross country, tennis and track & field; women's sports include basketball, cross country, softball, tennis, track & field, and volleyball; and co-ed sports include competitive cheer. Former sports included football.

Men's Basketball

Accomplishments
 NAIA Division I National Championship Appearances (17): 2015–16, 2014–15, 2013–14, 2012–13, 2011–12, 2010–11, 2007–08, 2006–07, 2004–05, 2003–04, 2000–01, 1996–97, 1990–91, 1981–82, 1980–81, 1972–73, 1971–72
 Gulf Coast Athletic Conference Regular-Season Champions (10): 2013–14, 2012–13, 2011–12, 2006–07, 2003–04, 2000–01, 1986–87, 1985–86, 1982–83, 1981–82
 Gulf Coast Athletic Conference Tournament Champions (1): 1995-96
 Gulf Coast Athletic Conference/NAIA District 30 Tournament Champions (2): 1990–91, 1981–82
 NAIA District 30 Tournament Champions (3): 1980–81, 1972–73, 1971–72
 Southern Intercollegiate Athletic Conference Tournament Champions (3): 1940–41, 1938–39, 1937–38

Women's Basketball

Accomplishments
 NAIA Division I National Championship Appearances (19): 2015–16, 2013–14, 2012–13, 2011–12, 2010–11, 2009–10, 2007–08, 2006–07, 2004–05, 2003–04, 2002–03, 2001–02, 2000–01, 1998–99, 1997–98, 1996–97, 1995–96, 1994–95, 1993–94
 Gulf Coast Athletic Conference Regular-Season Champions (13): 2012–13, 2011–12, 2009–10, 2004–05, 2003–04, 2002–03, 2000–01, 1996–97, 1995–96, 1994–95, 1993–94, 1986–87, 1981–82
 Gulf Coast Athletic Conference Tournament Champions (13): 2015–16, 2013–14, 2011–12, 2010–11, 2009–10, 2007–08, 2004–05, 2000–01, 1996–97, 1995–96, 1994–95, 1993-94
 Gulf Coast Athletic Conference/NAIA District 30 Tournament Champions (2): 1989–90, 1981–82
 NAIA District 30 Tournament Champions (1): 1980-81

Men's Cross Country

Accomplishments
 NAIA National Championship Appearances (13): Team in 2014, 2012, 2011, 2009, 2008, 2002; individuals in 2013, 2003, 2000, 1999, 1998, 1997, 1994
 NAIA Region XIII Champions (1): 2002
 Gulf Coast Athletic Conference Champions (9): 2014, 2013, 2012, 2011, 2010, 2009, 2008, 2007, 2006

Women's Cross Country

Accomplishments
 NAIA National Championship Appearances (9): Team in 2014, 2012, 2011, 2009, 2008, 2002; individuals in 2013, 2003, 2001
 NAIA Region XIII Champions (1): 2002
 Gulf Coast Athletic Conference Champions (10): 2014, 2013, 2012, 2011, 2010, 2009, 2008, 2007, 2006, 2002

Men's Tennis

Accomplishments
 NAIA National Championship Appearances (8): 2016, 2015, 2014, 2013, 2012, 2011, 2010, 2009
 Gulf Coast Athletic Conference Champions (5): 2010, 2009, 2008, 2007, 2005
 NAIA Unaffiliated Group Champions (3): 2013, 2012, 2011

Women's Tennis

Accomplishments
 NAIA National Championship Appearances (9): 2016, 2014, 2013, 2012, 2010, 2009, 2008, 2005, 2004
 Gulf Coast Athletic Conference Champions (7): 2010, 2009, 2007, 2005, 2004, 2003, 2002
 NAIA Unaffiliated Group Champions (3): 2014, 2013, 2012

Men's Track & Field

Accomplishments
 Southern Intercollegiate Athletic Conference Outdoor Champions (14): 1958, 1957, 1955, 1953, 1952, 1951, 1949, 1948, 1943, 1942, 1941, 1940, 1939, 1938
 Gulf Coast Athletic Conference Outdoor Champions (1): 2004

Women's Track & Field

Accomplishments
 Gulf Coast Athletic Conference Outdoor Champions (5): 2015, 2014, 2013, 2011, 2004

Volleyball

Accomplishments
 NAIA National Championship Appearances (5): 2015, 2014, 2013, 2012, 2011
 Gulf Coast Athletic Conference Regular-Season Champions (5): 2015, 2014, 2013, 2012, 2011
 Gulf Coast Athletic Conference Tournament Champions (5): 2015, 2014, 2013, 2012, 2011

Cheerleading

Accomplishments
 NAIA National Champions: 2021-22
 Black College National Championships Appearances, Collegiate All Girls (2): first place in 2004, second place in 2003

Gold Star Dancers

Accomplishments
 Black College National Championships Appearances (2): fourth place in 2004, third place in 2003

Former varsity sports

Football
Xavier University formerly sponsored a varsity football team starting in 1925. In 1955, Xavier played the Keesler Air Force Base team in Louisiana's first integrated college football game. The team's last season was 1959 and the program was disbanded in 1960 along with all sports at the university. The team played at the XU Football Field located in Xavier Stadium.

New varsity sports 
The Xavier baseball program was revived in 2019, with its first game in over 60 years played February 23, 2021. The softball program, announced at the same time, played its first game in February 2021 as well. Major League Baseball assisted in the revival of the programs, lending its Wesley Barrow Stadium as home field for both programs.

Athletics facilities

Current facilities

Xavier University Academic Convocation Center
The Xavier University Academic Convocation Center opened in November 2012. The 97,000 square-foot multipurpose facility replaced The Barn (Xavier's 1,300-seat gymnasium which opened in 1937) and became the new home of XU men's basketball, women's basketball and women's volleyball. The 3,937-seat facility includes a hospitality suite, a student-athlete fitness center, a media/video room, a theatre-style meeting space, and a state-of-the-art athletic training facility. The arena contains state-of-the-art sound, lighting and high-definition Daktronics video boards for spectator comfort. The Convocation Center also plays host to many classes, graduations, sporting and community events.

Convocation Center Annex
As part of the growth of the Xavier main campus as well as the athletics department, the Convocation Center Annex project was completed in 2012.
The facility, located adjacent to the Convocation Center, is an academic building featuring several classrooms, reception and lecture spaces, meeting spaces, and administrative offices of the Athletics Department, Recreation Sports and Physical Education.

City Park Cross Country Course
Xavier's cross country teams compete on the City Park Cross Country Course in City Park, a public facility. The mostly flat course is approximately three miles from the XU campus and is near the corner of Wisner Boulevard and Harrison Avenue.  Xavier competed twice at City Park in 2014, including the Gulf Coast Athletic Conference Championships.  City Park covers 1,300 acres and was established in 1853. It is approximately 50 percent larger than Central Park in New York City. City Park holds the world's largest collection of mature live oak trees, some older than 600 years in age.

Tad Gormley Stadium
Xavier's track and field teams compete at Tad Gormley Stadium (located at City Park, 2.6 miles from XU's campus) and practices regularly at the City Park Practice Track adjacent to the stadium.  Tad Gormley Stadium offers great versatility for staging events in New Orleans - from outdoor athletic competitions to concerts and corporate special events.  Gormley was the site of the 1992 U.S. Olympic Track and Field Trials, the 1993 NCAA Division I Outdoor Track and Field Championships and the 1998 U.S. Track and Field Championships.

Gormley's address is 5400 Stadium Drive, New Orleans, LA 70124.

Stadium Features:
•  26,500 permanent seats 
•  400-meter polyurethane track 
•  Artificial turf playing field 
•  Three locker rooms 
•  Press box with seating for 110 
•  Press suite with seating for 40 
•  Electronic scoreboard and state-of-the-art sound system

XULA Tennis Center
The XULA Tennis Center opened on October 26, 2012, as the home of XU men's and women's tennis.

Facility Facts:
 GPS Driving Location:  3619 Pine St., New Orleans LA 70125
 Facility cost:  $2.5 million
 Architect:  Manning Architects
 Contractor:  Gibbs Construction
 First women's dual match:  Xavier 9, Loyola 0 on January 25, 2013
 First men's dual match:  Xavier 7, Loyola 2 on February 6, 2013
 First collegiate dual match not involving Xavier:  Idaho 4, Youngstown State 3 (women) on March 10, 2013

Former facilities

The Barn
The Barn was the former home arena for the men's and women's basketball teams and volleyball team located on the Xavier campus. It opened in 1937 and was demolished in 2013.

Xavier Stadium
Xavier Stadium is a former stadium that included the XU football field and also a track. It was the former home of the Xavier football team and track and field team. The stadium was located at the corner of Washington Street and Pine Street in New Orleans.

Non-varsity athletic facilities

Fitness Center
On June 24, 2015, the university opened its Fitness Center.  The $3.6 million facility is built between the Living Learning Center and St. Martin de Porres Hall, Xavier's two largest student residences on the site of the former B. Samuels building, which was bought and demolished.  The first floor of the two-story facility offers an NCAA/NAIA regulation-sized basketball court, an office, a lounge area and an area with free weights and weight machines. The second floor consists of a three-lane walking/running track, a cardio room, spin studio and other multifunctional studios. Exercise machines will be available throughout the facility.  The basketball court will be mostly used for intramural events such as basketball and volleyball, large exercise classes, fitness activities, yoga, dance and Zumba classes. The court can be divided with a retractable curtain to offer multiple activities simultaneously. This is the fourth XU athletics facility to open in three years.

See also
National Association of Intercollegiate Athletics

References

External links
 Official website